PolicyLink is a national research and action institute dedicated to advancing economic and social equity. It focuses on policies affecting low-income communities and communities of color. It is a nonprofit organization based in Oakland, California, with branch offices in New York City; Washington, DC; and Los Angeles.

Background
Founded in 1999 by Angela Glover Blackwell, PolicyLink aims to create sustainable communities by improving communities' access to quality jobs, affordable housing, good schools, transportation, and other prerequisites for healthy neighborhoods. Taking an approach that emphasizes localism, it pursues its mission by facilitating local organizations and grassroots organizers. The group shares its findings and analyses through its website, publications and blog; it also convenes national summits, and holds briefings with national and local policymakers. PolicyLink is staffed by attorneys and public policy experts in California, Washington, D.C., and New York.

As of 2021, PolicyLink holds a 4-star rating from Charity Navigator, based on an overall score of 95.45 out of 100.

Focus areas

Center for Health and Place
Angela Glover Blackwell, PolicyLink CEO, wrote in The Washington Post that "Congress must start thinking of health beyond health care .... We can no longer afford to have a 'sickness-driven' view of our health. We must create healthier communities—places with easy access to fresh food, parks, safe streets, and clean air—to help all Americans live healthier, longer lives and reduce health-care costs while we're at it." This focus on health policy has led to the group’s collaborations with the Robert Wood Johnson Foundation's Center to Prevent Childhood Obesity and The Healthy Eating Active Living Convergence Partnership.

Bay Area Equity Atlas
PolicyLink manages the Bay Area Equity Atlas with the USC Equity Research Institute and the San Francisco Foundation. Research conducted by the Bay Area Equity Atlas is used to lobby the state legislature.

Board of directors
As of 2021, PolicyLink's board of directors includes:

 Dolores Acevedo-Garcia, Brandeis University
 Richard Baron, McCormack Baron Salazar, Inc.
 Sheri Dunn Berry, Community Partners
 Geoffrey Canada, author and CEO of Harlem Children's Zone
 Radhika Fox, US Water Alliance
 Stewart Kwoh, Asian Americans Advancing Justice - Los Angeles
 Joan Walsh, The Nation

References

External links
 PolicyLink
 PolicyLink's Equity Blog

Organizations based in Oakland, California
Research institutes in California